= Pankhiya =

Regions with significant populations
- India

Religion
- Islam

The Pankhiya are a community found in the state of Uttar Pradesh in India.
